Rarities, B-Sides, and Other Stuff Volume 2 is the second compilation album of rarities by Canadian singer-songwriter Sarah McLachlan, released in April 2008, twelve years after its predecessor. It was produced by longtime collaborator Pierre Marchand.

Track listing

Charts

Certifications and sales

See also
Rarities, B-Sides and Other Stuff

References

B-side compilation albums
2008 compilation albums
Nettwerk Records compilation albums
Arista Records compilation albums
Sarah McLachlan compilation albums
Albums produced by Pierre Marchand